Corylus colurna, the Turkish hazel or Turkish filbert, is a deciduous tree native to southeast Europe and southwest Asia, from the Balkans through northern Turkey to northern Iran. It is also found growing wild in the forests of Western Himalayan range in the north Indian state of Himachal Pradesh particularly in the temperate regions of districts of Kullu, Shimla, Kinnaur district and Chamba district.

Description
The bark is pale grey-buff, with a thick, corky texture.

The leaves are deciduous, rounded, 6–15 cm long and 5–13 cm across, softly hairy on both surfaces, and with a coarsely double-serrate to shallowly lobed margin. The main limbs are quite small in diameter in relationship to the straight trunk, and arise at almost a 90-degree angle. Making the tree quite durable to urban conditions and helps maintain a symmetrical crown which landscape architects love so much.

The flowers bloom in early spring before the leaves, and are unisexual, with single-sex catkins; the male pale yellow and 5–10 cm long, the female very small and largely concealed in the buds, with only the bright red 1–3 mm long styles visible.  The flowers on female trees are not very visible. On male trees, however, the flowers are visible.

The fruit is a nut sometimes called "Turkish nuts" about 1–2 cm long, surrounded by a thick, softly spiny and bristly involucre (husk) 3 cm diameter, which encloses all but the tip of the nut; the nuts are borne in tight clusters of 3-8 together, with the involucres fused at the base. The fruit matures in September and is edible, with a taste that is very similar to common hazels. They are occasionally gathered from the wild as well as from urban trees, but their small size (smaller than common hazel nuts) and very hard, thick nut shell (3 mm thick) makes them of little or no commercial value. Corylus colurna is however important in commercial hazelnut orchards, as it does not sucker, making it the ideal rootstock on which to graft the nut-bearing common hazel cultivars. The nut can only be found on female trees. Nut production is irregular and occurs every two to three years

Root
Corylus colurna has fibrous roots. The roots of Corylus colurna are not adventitious, meaning they do not form suckers. This makes Corylus colurna desirable for grafting on the rootstock over a single stemmed trees. This allows Corylus colurna to be grown in poorer and rocky soils.

Cultivation
Corylus colurna has a medium growth rate. It is occasionally drought tolerant and alkaline soil tolerant. However, it prefers moist, well-drained soil, as well as full sun. Once established Corylus colurna is tolerant of heat, cold, and drought.

There are no serious pests or problems with Corylus colurna.

Corylus colurna is not easily transplantable and will need extra watering in summer after transplanting. It will take about two years after transplant for the tree to become established and survive on its own.

Corylus colurna has received the Royal Horticultural Society's Award of Garden Merit.

Propagation
The most common form of propagation for Corylus colurna is by seed. It is best sown as soon as it is harvested in autumn in a cold frame. The seed will germinate in late winter or spring. If starting with a stored seed, the seed should be pre-soaked in warm water for 48 hours and then given 2 weeks warm followed by 3 to 4 months cold stratification. This will allow the seed to germinate in 1 to 6 months if kept at 20 °C. Once the seed is large enough to handle, pick the seedlings out into individual pots and grow them on in a cold frame or sheltered place outdoors for their first winter. You can plant the seed into their permanent positions in late spring or early summer.

Identification Features
There are a couple distinct features to identify Corylus colurna.  Leaves are alternate, simple, broadly ovate to obovate, doubly serrate, glabrous above, and pubescent veins below. Corylus colurnas buds are 1/3 inch long, green tinted brown. and softly pubescent. Young trees have gray stems.

Uses
Besides its use as a single-stem rootstock for Corylus avellana, Corylus colurna is widely cultivated as an ornamental tree in Europe and North America. It is very tolerant of difficult growing conditions in urban situations, which in recent decades has increased its popularity in civic planting schemes. Turkish hazel makes a good shade tree since it produces very dense shade, and its narrow crown and ability to withstand air-pollution make it well suited for use as a street tree in urban areas. It makes a rather formal statement in the landscape due to the tight, consistently-shaped, narrow crown. It is well suited for areas which have restricted overhead. Corylus colurna is also used in different sized parking lot islands and a variety of wide lawns. It is recommended for a buffer strip around parking lots or highways. Also it is used as a street tree, specimen tree, or in sidewalk cut outs. Other landscape uses for Corylus colurna are for fruit, difficult and dry sites, naturalistic areas, and street trees.

Gallery

References

External links

 Corylus colurna - information, genetic conservation units and related resources. European Forest Genetic Resources Programme (EUFORGEN)

colurna
Trees of Western Asia
Trees of Pakistan
Trees of Turkey
Trees of Azerbaijan
Plants described in 1753
Taxa named by Carl Linnaeus
Flora of Montenegro